Themi is an administrative ward in the Arusha District of the Arusha Region of Tanzania. It is home to Themi Hill which is 1,457 meters tall. The ward also gets its name from the hill and river which runs on its western border. Themi ward is bordered by Kati and Sekei wards to the north. Kimandolu, Moshono, Olorien wards border the ward to the east. To the south is Engutoto and Lemara wards. Lastly, to the west Themi ward is bordered  by Daraja Mbili ward. According to the 2012 census, the ward had a total population of 9,458

Economy
Themi ward is home to a number of significant manufancturing industries in the city. Tanzania Breweries Limited is the largest factory in the ward, producing product for the northern and central areas. Also Fiberboards factory is located in the ward, further employing hundreds. Sunflag  Tanzania Limited factory as well as Arusha Coffee Mills, Sunkist Bakery Limited, Hanspaul Group Limited, Darsh Industries Limited and Tanelec Limited are also big employers in the ward. The north part of Themi ward is home to a high number of middle to upper class residential areas.

Administration and neighborhoods 
The postal code for Themi Ward is 23109. 
The ward is divided into the following neighborhoods: 
 Aicc, Themi
 Corridor, Themi
 Old Police Line, Themi
 Themi Mashariki, Themi

Education
Themi ward is home to these educational institutions: 
 Themi Primary School
 Prime School (private)
 Arusha Day Secondary School
 Arusha School
 Tanganyika School Early Years (private)

Healthcare
Themi ward is home to the following health institutions:
 Themi Health Center
 Total Care Health Center
 Well Point Health Center
 Kam Medical Health Center
 Old Arusha Health Center

References

Wards of Arusha City
Wards of Arusha Region